The Samaná Península is a peninsula in Dominican Republic situated in the province of Samaná. The Samaná Peninsula is connected to the rest of the state by the isthmus of Samaná; to its south is Samaná Bay. The peninsula contains many beaches, especially in the city of Santa Bárbara de Samaná. It contains three rivers.

Transportation
The main roads are the DR-5 and the Samaná Highway, which leads from the peninsula to Santo Domingo. The peninsula also contains the Samaná El Catey International Airport. The peninsula also hosts agriculture and tourism.

Gallery

See also
 1873 Dominican Republic Samaná Peninsula referendum

External links
El Catey International Airport Samana - Dominican Republic
Travel Guide to Samana Peninsula

Landforms of the Dominican Republic
Geography of Samaná Province